The Xilongchi Pumped Storage Power Station is a pumped-storage hydroelectric power station located  east of Xinzhou in Wutai County of Shanxi Province, China. It was constructed between 2001 and 2008. The power station operates by shifting water between an upper and lower reservoir to generate electricity. The lower reservoir was formed with the creation of the Xilongchi Lower Dam. The Xilongchi Upper Reservoir is located high atop a mountain above the northeast side of the lower reservoir. Both reservoirs are located between the confluence of the Hutuo and Qingshui Rivers. During periods of low energy demand, such as at night, water is pumped from Xilongchi Lower Reservoir up to the upper reservoir. When energy demand is high, the water is released back down to the lower reservoir but the pump turbines that pumped the water up now reverse mode and serve as generators to produce electricity. The process is repeated as necessary and the plant serves as a peaking power plant.

Water from the upper reservoir is sent to the 1,200 MW underground power station down near the lower reservoir through headrace/penstock pipes.

See also

List of pumped-storage power stations

References

Dams in China
Pumped-storage hydroelectric power stations in China
Dams completed in 2008
Energy infrastructure completed in 2008
2008 establishments in China
Rock-filled dams
Hydroelectric power stations in Shanxi
Xinzhou
Underground power stations